Joseph Han may refer to:

Joseph Han Yingjin (born 1958), Chinese Roman Catholic bishop in Sanyuan (Shaanxi)
Joseph Han Zhihai (born 1966), Chinese Roman Catholic bishop in Lanzhou